NK Travnik, commonly known as Travnik is a professional association football club from the city of Travnik that is situated in Bosnia and Herzegovina.

Currently, Travnik plays in the First League of the Federation of Bosnia and Herzegovina and plays its home matches on Stadion Pirota which has a capacity of 4,000 seats.

History

Early period
NK Travnik was founded in 1922. The club is not really known for its period during the former Yugoslavia, as its mostly known since the end of the Bosnian War and since the mid 1990s.

Post-Yugoslav period
The club played in the First League of Bosnia and Herzegovina from 1995 to 1998, finishing 11th in the 1995–96 season, 14th in the 1996–97 and then getting eliminated in the 1997–98 after finishing on 15th place.

After winning the Second League of BiH in the 1999–2000 season, Travnik got promoted to the first 2000–01 Bosnian Premier League season, but got relegated after only one year of playing top league football. The club played two years in the First League of FBiH, before once again getting promoted in the 2002–03 season. The 2005–06 season got saw Travnik get relegated from the Premier League for the second time, but it got promoted the next year in the 2006–07 First League of FBiH season.

Present years
Since the 2006–07 promotion, Travnik played in the Premier League for 9 seasons in a row, finishing almost every season in the lower part of the league table. It got relegated for a third time in the 2015–16 season, and has not got promoted to the Premier League ever since, even getting relegated from the First League of FBiH in the 2017–18 season.

Travnik did get promoted right away from the Second League of FBiH (West division) to the First League in the 2018–19 season, and currently plays in the already mentioned second tier of the Bosnia and Herzegovina football league system.

Honours

Domestic

League

First League of the Federation of Bosnia and Herzegovina:
Winners (3): 1999–00, 2002–03, 2006–07
Second League of the Federation of Bosnia and Herzegovina:
Winners (1): 2018–19

Players

Current squad

Players with multiple nationalities

  Marko Baltić

Club officials

Coaching staff
{|
|valign="top"|

Other information

References

External links
NK Travnik at Facebook

 
Travnik
1922 establishments in Bosnia and Herzegovina
Association football clubs established in 1922
Football clubs in Yugoslavia
Football clubs in Bosnia and Herzegovina